The UNIFFAC Cup was a football tournament played in Gabon in 1999. The trophy was named after the then Gabonese president Omar Bongo.

The matches
Originally there were 8 teams, divided into two groups, with the top 2 of each group advancing to the semifinals. However, after Cameroon and DR Congo pulled out, a league format was introduced.

 All matches were played in Stade Omar Bongo, Libreville, Gabon.

References
RSSSF archives

Football in Gabon